The Bengal Criminal Law Amendment Ordinance of 1924, enacted into law as Bengal Criminal Law Amendment Act in 1925, was a criminal law ordinance enacted in October 1924 in Bengal, in British India. The law was implemented to stem the rise in revolutionary nationalism by the Jugantar group  against The Raj in Bengal after 1922. Following the collapse of the Nonviolent movement, the remnants of the Anushilan Samiti reformed under the leadership of Surya Sen, Hem Chandra Kanungo and Bhupendranath Dutta and re-engaged in nationalist independence movements against the Raj. A string of violence through 1923 saw murders of police witnesses and informers, culminating in the attempt to assassinate  Charles Tegart by Gopinath Saha, leading to the mistaken killing of another European. In response, following a number of requests from the Governor of Bengal, the ordinance was enacted extending the extraordinary powers of the Regulation III of 1818. It removed rights of Habeas corpus, reintroduced measures of indefinite and arbitrary detentions, and trials by tribunal without jury and without right of appeal. The ordinance was enacted into law in 1925 and remained in force for 5 years. Almost One hundred and fifty people were detained under the law, including among the notable detainees Subhas Chandra Bose, later Congress leader. The act was re-enacted in 1930, and later formed a basis for the Burma Criminal Law Amendment in 1931.

See also
Defence of India act, 1915
Rowlatt Act

References
History of the Freedom Movement in India (1857-1947). By S. N. Sen.p 245.
The History of British India: A Chronology. By John F. Riddick. p106
Emergency Powers in Asia: Exploring the Limits of Legality. By Victor V. Ramraj, Arun K. Thiruvengadam. p199-200
Hansard record of House of Lords debate on Bengal Ordinance
South Asia Archive records of Bengal Criminal Law Ordinance

Legislation in British India
Anushilan Samiti
1925 in India
1925 in law
1925 in British law